Estola vittulata is a species of beetle in the family Cerambycidae. It was described by Henry Walter Bates in 1874. It is known from Panama, Mexico and Venezuela.

References

Estola
Beetles described in 1874